Love, Girls and Soldiers (German: Liebe, Mädchen und Soldaten) is a 1958 Austrian musical comedy film directed by Franz Antel and starring Renate Holm, Willy Hagara and Carla Hagen.

The film's sets were designed by the art director Sepp Rothaur. It was shot using Agfacolor. It was distributed by the prominent West German company Gloria Film.

Cast
 Renate Holm as Steffi Gruber - Sängerin  
 Willy Hagara as Edi Zaremba - Sänger u. Rekrut  
 Carla Hagen as Anuschka  
 Franz Muxeneder as Alois Krumstiel - Rekrut  
 Walter Müller as Oberleutnant Bobby von Riedhoff  
 Rolf Olsen as Max Feierabend - Feldwebel  
 Loni Heuser as Gisela von Siebenstern, seine Frau  
 Hubert von Meyerinck as Major von Siebenstern  
 Helga Martin as Mimi Holzer - die Tochter  
 Hans Olden as Major Holzer - Regimentskommandant  
 Willy Millowitsch as Fritz, Feldwebel  
 C.W. Fernbach as Ferdy Wimmer - Sekretär  
 Ilse Peternell as Stubenmädchen  
 Raoul Retzer as Kolomann, Rekturt  
 Thomas Hörbiger as Hanusch, Rekrut  
 Fritz Imhoff as Schöberl, Empfangschef

References

Bibliography 
 Robert von Dassanowsky. Austrian Cinema: A History. McFarland, 2005.

External links 
 

1958 films
1958 musical comedy films
Austrian musical comedy films
1950s German-language films
Films directed by Franz Antel
Military humor in film
Films set in the 1900s
Gloria Film films
1950s historical comedy films
Austrian historical comedy films
1950s historical musical films
Austrian historical musical films